The 1977–78 season was the 54th season in the existence of AEK Athens F.C. and the 19th consecutive season in the top flight of Greek football. They competed in the Alpha Ethniki, the Greek Cup and the UEFA Cup. The season began on 11 September 1977 and finished on 4 June 1978.

Overview

AEK started the season "boosted" from last season's course to the UEFA Cup semi-finals and with the second place in the previous championship, as well as the quality they presented in their games, showed the unquenchable willingness of the club of Loukas Barlos to constantly look for more. The staffing of the team continued at a steady pace. The full-back of Egaleo, Aris Damianidis, the Uruguayan midfielder Milton Viera from Olympiacos, the top scorer of last season second division with AEL, Giannis Mousouris, who was converted into a right-back and most importantly the Yugoslav international striker, Dušan Bajević from Velež Mostar, filled any gaps in the club's roster.

At the beginning of the season, the first clouds gathered over Barlos' collaboration with František Fadrhonc. The philosophical differences between the two men regarding the future course of the team were presented, as Barlos wanted the staffing of AEK with big names, who would launch them to the top, while the "grandfather" seemed to prefer the gradual staffing of the team through their academies, which he had under his supervision and had upgraded to a fairly high level. The price of their difference of philosophy resulted in the removal of Fadrhonc after the away defeat against Olympiacos at the 2nd matchday. The Czech's assistant Andreas Stamatiadis sat on the team's bench for the next two games as an interim coach and from there Zlatko Čajkovski took over the fate of AEK. The so-called "Čik" as an ardent supporter of attacking and spectacular football, continued Fadrhonc's work handling the club's roster perfectly. In the UEFA Cup, AEK faced the Romanian ASA Târgu Mureș, for the First Round. In Romania, AEK presented a mediocre appearance, which was largely due to the tragic condition of the field. It rained torrentially at the city for two consecutive days before the match, resulting in a mud-flooded pitch. The Romanians, took advantage of AEK's inability to develop their technical virtues on the field and not only did they defend effectively, but also won by 1–0. In the replay match, AEK were imposing and the score stopped at 3–0, while they lost many opportunities for more throughout the second half. The draw brought AEK at the Second Round opponents with the Belgian Standard Liège, which proved to be a difficult opponent and managed to leave the AEK stadium with a draw. The replay match found AEK unlucky, as they were left behind 1–0 by an own goal. The yellow and blacks managed to recover from the shock and they will equalized in 1–1, but in the last half hour of the match found AEK exhausted and Standard Liège with everything on their side, including necessary luck, they scored 3 goals. At the 15th matchday, the games took place the day after Christmas and the footballers' union proceeded to the first mobilization of the industry, claiming a strike for the specific matchday, which resulted the clubs lining up with players from the amateur divisions and only foreign professionals. After the passing of the first months and the recovery of the injured Bajević, AEK looked like a goal machine. They achieved a total of 74 goals having the best attack of the league, which they won with a difference of 7 points from the second PAOK. It was characteristic that after the defeat in the 2nd match that brought about the removal of Fadrhonc, AEK were defeated only once. Thomas Mavros was the league's top scorer with 22 goals, while in fourth place was Takis Nikoloudis with 15.

AEK's superiority and the big difference of points which they won the league was also verified in the Greek Cup. Čajkovski's team seemed unstoppable as they eliminated AO Chania at home in the first round, Panathinaikos away in the second round and Panionios at home in the round of 16. In the quarter-finals, AEK defeated Panelefsiniakos away and advanced to the semi-finals, where they faced Olympiacos in Nea Filadelfeia. The "mistake" of Olympiacos to precede at the beginning of the match, made AEK "furious" and retaliated with 6 goals. AEK confirming their characterization as "unstoppable", defeated PAOK 2–0 in the final and won the Greek Cup, as well as the Double for the second time in their history after 39 years. Dušan Bajević emergerd as the top scorer in the tournament with 9 goals.

Players

Squad information

NOTE: The players are the ones that have been announced by the AEK Athens' press release. No edits should be made unless a player arrival or exit is announced. Updated 30 June 1978, 23:59 UTC+3.

Transfers

In

Out

Overall transfer activity

Expenditure:  ₯3,000,000

Income:  ₯0

Net Total:  ₯3,000,000

Pre-season and friendlies

Alpha Ethniki

League table

Results summary

Results by Matchday

Fixtures

Greek Cup

Matches

UEFA Cup

First round

Second round

Statistics

Squad statistics

! colspan="11" style="background:#FFDE00; text-align:center" | Goalkeepers
|-

! colspan="11" style="background:#FFDE00; color:black; text-align:center;"| Defenders
|-

! colspan="11" style="background:#FFDE00; color:black; text-align:center;"| Midfielders
|-

! colspan="11" style="background:#FFDE00; color:black; text-align:center;"| Forwards
|-

! colspan="11" style="background:#FFDE00; text-align:center" | Left during season
|-

! colspan="11" style="background:#FFDE00; color:black; text-align:center;"| From Reserve Squad
|-

|}

Disciplinary record

|-
! colspan="17" style="background:#FFDE00; text-align:center" | Goalkeepers

|-
! colspan="17" style="background:#FFDE00; color:black; text-align:center;"| Defenders

|-
! colspan="17" style="background:#FFDE00; color:black; text-align:center;"| Midfielders

|-
! colspan="17" style="background:#FFDE00; color:black; text-align:center;"| Forwards

|-
! colspan="17" style="background:#FFDE00; text-align:center" | Left during season

|-
! colspan="17" style="background:#FFDE00; color:black; text-align:center;"| From Reserve Squad

|}

References

External links
AEK Athens F.C. Official Website

AEK Athens F.C. seasons
AEK Athens
1977–78